Nevada County Air Park  is a public airport in Nevada County, California, three miles east of Grass Valley, California. It is also known as Nevada County Airport.

Most U.S. airports use the same three-letter location identifier for the Federal Aviation Administration (FAA) and IATA, but this airport is GOO to the FAA and has no IATA code. (IATA assigned GOO to an airport in Goondiwindi, Queensland, Australia.)

History 
The air park was built by local entrepreneur Errol MacBoyle to fly gold mined by his Idaho–Maryland Mine Corporation to Mills Field, now known as San Francisco International Airport.  From there it was driven to the San Francisco Mint by the company's treasurer. Located on MacBoyle's Loma Rica Ranch property, Loma Rica Airport was a mile east of MacBoyle's residence. By 1934, the airstrip included a hangar, shops, and a full time radio operator. Eventually, the airport included lights for night landings on its 2400 foot airstrip.

The airport was closed down at the onset of World War II due in part to the government shutdown of mining operations along with the wartime ban on civilian flight within 150 miles of the coast of California. The airport property was purchased from the MacBoyle estate by Charles Litton Sr. in 1955. Litton had previously moved his company's engineering laboratory to Grass Valley in 1953. After acquiring the property, Litton spent $10,000 to repair the runway that had fallen into disrepair and partnered with local government and businesses through the Grass Valley Chamber of Commerce to reopen the airport and build an industrial park in order to attract new business to the region. 

The airport was reopened in 1956 and renamed Loma Rica Airport. In 1957, the airport and access roads were given to Nevada County. The United States Forest Service and California Department of Forestry and Fire Protection began using the airport as a base for their wildfire air attack operations in 1958. A major renovation took place in 1965 when the landing strip was lengthened to 4,000 feet (1,200 m). In 1994 a 3000 square foot terminal was added and the following year the landing strip was again extended.

Facilities
Its single runway, 7/25, is 4,351 by 75 feet (1,326 x 23 m).

In 2015 the airport had 27,750 aircraft operations, average 76 per day: 96% general aviation and 4% air taxi. 142 aircraft were then based at this airport — 95% single-engine, 4% multi-engine and 1% helicopter.

References

External links 
 Official site
 Aerial photo as of 16 August 1998 from United States Geological Survey The National Map
 
 
 
 airfest.wixsite.com/airfest — Grass Valley Airshow and Brewfest

Airports in Nevada County, California
Airports established in 1933
1933 establishments in California